Dmytro Gurnytskyi (born 24 October 1994) is a Ukrainian swimmer. He competed in the men's 50 metre backstroke event at the 2017 World Aquatics Championships.

References

External links
 

1994 births
Living people
Ukrainian male backstroke swimmers
Place of birth missing (living people)
21st-century Ukrainian people